Chakrees is a 2021 Pakistani drama serial that aired on TV One. Written by Edison Masih, it stars Faizan Khawaja, Maryam Fatima, Srha Asghar, Zain Afzal, Zara Ahmed, and Danish Wakeel in prominent roles. Chakrees is a thrilling story of seven young adults who want to live life on their own terms and carve their future.

Cast

Main Cast
Faizan Khawaja as Zafar Ahmed Khan
Maryam Fatima as Shabana
Srha Asghar as Sukaina aka Sakeena
Zain Afzal as Waqar
Danish Wakeel as Gulraiz
Zara Ahmed as Noori
Aamir Ali Bangash as Ali

Supporting Cast
Qavi Khan as Shamim Ahmed
Usman Javed as Masood

Production
Chakrees is directed and produced by Mohsin Talat who directed popular serials, namely, Ghar Titli Ka Par, Jaal, and Daasi. The series premiered on 20 January 2021, airing episodes weekly on Wednesday at prime time (i.e; 8:00 PM) on TV One. The series is also available for streaming on Viu.

References

External links

Pakistani drama television series
2021 Pakistani television series debuts
2021 Pakistani television series endings
TVOne Pakistan
Urdu-language television shows